Maya or Maiia Vladislavovna Khromykh (born 25 May 2006) is a Russian figure skater. She is the 2021 Gran Premio d'Italia silver medalist, the 2021 Rostelecom Cup bronze medalist, the 2021 CS Warsaw Cup champion, and the 2021 Budapest Trophy champion.

On the junior level, she is the 2019 JGP France bronze medalist, and the 2019 Denis Ten Memorial Challenge silver medalist. She finished fourth at the 2020 World Junior Championships.

Personal life 
Maya Khromykh was born on 25 May 2006 in Nizhny Tagil, Russia. Maya's father Vladislav Khromykh is an ice hockey coach. He was a head coach of the Russian ice hockey team at the 2017 Winter Universiade where the team won the gold medal. Her brother Yaroslav is a hockey player.

Career

Early years 
Khromykh began learning how to skate in 2009 as early as at the age of three. She was coached by Anna Boldina and subsequently by Anna Tsareva at Sambo-70 'Khrustalniy' until autumn 2018. She then joined Eteri Tutberidze, Daniil Gleikhengauz and Sergei Dudakov.

2019–20 season 
At the 2019 Russian Cup Final held in Novgorod, Russia, Khromykh scored 201.06 in total winning junior ladies' gold with Daria Usacheva to claim silver with a total score of 189.83 points and Anna Frolova claiming bronze with the score of 189.38 points.

On international arena, Khromykh debuted in the 2019/2020 skating season in August 2019 at the 2019 JGP France in Courchevel. Although she won the short program, she ranked fifth in the free skate, and overall finished third behind fellow Russian Kamila Valieva winning gold and South Korean silver medalist Wi Seo-yeong.
 
At her second assignment, the 2019 JGP Latvia in September, Khromykh ranked second after the short program, but fell to fourth in the free skate standings, and finished in the fourth place overall.

Competing at the Denis Ten Memorial Challenge held in Almaty, Kazakhstan, Khromykh won silver medal behind her fellow Russian Daria Usacheva.

In February 2020, scoring 204.40 in total, Khromykh took 5th position at the Russian Junior Nationals 2020, Junior Ladies held in Saransk, Mordovia.

During her first season competing on the international level, she was selected as one of the three main entries to represent Russia in the 2020 World Junior Figure Skating Championships. She finished 5th in the short program after a minor error on her triple loop landing. In the free skate she stepped out of the landing on her quad Salchow attempt, but avoided a fall and skated the rest of the program clean. She achieved a new personal best score for her free skate and total score. She finished fourth place overall.

2020–21 season
Competing as a senior at the domestic level, Khromykh won the bronze medals at the first Cup of Russia stage in Syzran and the fourth stage in Kazan.

These results qualified her for the 2021 Russian Championships, where she placed seventh in the short program. She was fifth in the free skate, falling on her attempted quad toe loop but going on to land seven triple jumps, and placed fifth overall.

In February, Khromykh took part in the 2021 Channel One Trophy, a televised team event organized in lieu of the cancelled European Championships, named to replace Alena Kostornaia, who withdrew for health reasons. She was selected for the Time of Firsts team captained by Evgenia Medvedeva. She finished fifth in the short program and sixth in the free skate, while the Time of Firsts finished in second place overall.

Khromykh's final event of the season was the Russian Cup Final, where she was fourth in the short program. In the free skate she landed the quad toeloop for the first time in competition, and introduced and landed the quadruple Salchow. She finished first in the free skate following Valieva's falling on her quad, and second overall behind Kamila Valieva by only 2.04 points based on Valieva's strong short program.

2021–22 season 
Khromykh debuted her programs for the 2021–22 season at the 2021 Russian test skate event in September. In her free skate, she cleanly landed a quad toeloop for the second time in her career in a competitive setting, but later popped a planned quad Salchow into a single.

Khromykh later opened her competitive season in mid-October at the 2021 Budapest Trophy. She placed second in the short program at the event behind teammate Anna Shcherbakova. During the free skate, she landed a clean quad toeloop-triple toeloop combination to move ahead of Shcherbakova, and win the event in her senior debut.

Khromykh made her Grand Prix debut at 2021 Gran Premio d'Italia where she placed second in the short program behind Loena Hendrickx. In the free skate, Khromykh successfully landed two quad toeloops and scored her personal best of 154.31 points to take silver medal behind her compatriot Anna Shcherbakova. At her next competition, the 2021 CS Warsaw Cup, Khromykh placed first in the short program, but struggled on her jumping passes in the free skate, most notably on her two planned quad toeloops, and fell to second in the free program. Her lead after the short bolstered her score and kept her in the lead overall to take the title.

At the 2021 Rostelecom Cup, Khromykh's second Grand Prix assignment, she placed fifth in the short program after falling on the triple Lutz in her planned triple Lutz-triple toeloop combination, but climbed to second in the free skate by landing both of her planned quad toeloops, and finished third overall behind compatriots Kamila Valieva and Elizaveta Tuktamysheva. Her results over her two Grand Prix events qualified her to the 2021–22 Grand Prix Final, seeded fourth behind Valieva, Shcherbakova, and Tuktamysheva. However, the Final was subsequently cancelled due to restrictions prompted by the Omicron variant.

At the 2022 Russian Championships, Khromykh placed eighth, and fifth among senior-eligible skaters. Khromykh was named as second alternate to the Russian women's team for the 2022 Winter Olympics on 20 January.

Programs

Competitive highlights 
GP: Grand Prix; JGP: Junior Grand Prix; CS: ISU Challenger Series

Detailed results

Senior level
Small medals for short and free programs awarded only at ISU Championships. Personal bests highlighted in bold.

Junior level
Small medals for short and free programs awarded only at ISU Championships. Personal bests highlighted in bold.

References

External links 
 

People from Nizhny Tagil
2006 births
Russian female single skaters
Living people
Sportspeople from Sverdlovsk Oblast